Edward Eugene Mendoza (born December 4, 1952) is an American long-distance runner. He competed in the men's 10,000 metres at the 1976 Summer Olympics, as well as the men's marathon at the 1983 World Championships in Athletics.

References

External links
 

1952 births
Living people
Athletes (track and field) at the 1976 Summer Olympics
American male long-distance runners
Olympic track and field athletes of the United States
Place of birth missing (living people)
20th-century American people